Samantha M. Poetter is an American politician serving as a member of the Kansas House of Representatives from the 6th district. Elected in November 2020, she assumed office on January 11, 2021.

Early life and education 
A first-generation American, Poetter was raised in Paola, Kansas, where her parents owned a restaurant. Poetter earned a Bachelor of Science degree in political science and government from Kansas State University.

Career 
As an undergraduate, Poetter worked as an intern in the office of the Secretary of State of Kansas. She then worked as a campaign staffer for Senator Pat Roberts. Poetter later served as the communications director for Secretary of State Kris Kobach. In 2016, Poetter became chair of Kansans for Conservative Values, a conservative political action committee.

2021-2022 Kansas House of Representatives Committee Assignments
Federal and State Affairs
Taxation
Corrections and Juvenile Justice

References 

Living people
People from Paola, Kansas
Kansas State University alumni
Republican Party members of the Kansas House of Representatives
Women state legislators in Kansas
21st-century American politicians
21st-century American women politicians
Year of birth missing (living people)